Elaine Phillips is an American politician who currently serves as Nassau County Comptroller, with a term beginning in January 2022. She was elected to the position in a landslide victory, defeating Democrat Ryan Cronin 61%-39% to succeed retiring incumbent Jack Schnirman. Phillips previously represented the New York State Senate's 7th district, and had previously served as the 18th Mayor of Flower Hill, New York. She is a Republican. Phillips was elected to the Senate in 2016, but was defeated in her 2018 re-election bid.

Life and career
Phillips was born and raised in Pennsylvania. She is the daughter of John Reidman, a steel worker who died when she was 12, and Betty Reidman, who worked as a cook at a local American Legion post. Phillips attended Penn State University, where she earned both her bachelor's degree and an M.B.A. in Finance. A former financial analyst, Phillips worked for large financial institutions for over 20 years, including Met Life and JP Morgan Securities. She later served as a vice president in Institutional Sales at Goldman Sachs.

Phillips and her husband, Andy, are the parents of three daughters.

Mayor of Flower Hill, New York (2012–2016)
Phillips served as the Mayor of Flower Hill, New York from 2012 to 2016. During her tenure as Mayor, she cut taxes and stabilized the village's finances (which, under her predecessor's management, were criticized by the New York State Comptroller's Office).  Phillips also implemented an environmental policy to expand the number of trees in the village, an effort which led the Village to be named Tree City USA by the National Arbor Day Committee.

Phillips was the first female in Flower Hill's history to hold the position.

New York State Senator (2017–2018)
In 2016, State Senator Jack Martins decided to run for Congress, foregoing re-election to the Senate to do so. Phillips announced that she would seek the open Senate seat and was supported by Martins.

Phillips ran on a platform which included cutting taxes, combating the heroin epidemic and strengthening state ethics laws in response to corruption scandals in Albany. Phillips was unopposed for the Republican nomination. With the Seventh district being one of the most competitive districts in the state, the race was projected to be close. In the end, Phillips defeated Democrat Adam M. Haber by a 51% to 49% margin.  She was sworn in on January 1, 2017.

In 2018, Phillips lost her re-election bid to Democrat Anna Kaplan.

Election results

 November 2016 general election, New York State Senate, 7th Senate District
{| class="Wikitable"
| Elaine R. Phillips (REP - CON - IND – REF)|| ... || 69,438 
|-
| Adam M. Haber (DEM - WFP - WEP)|| ... || 66,029
|}

 November 2021 general election, Nassau County, New York, Comptroller
{| class="Wikitable"
| Elaine R. Phillips (REP - CON  – || ... || 163,146
|-
| Ryan E. Cronin (DEM - WFP -|| ... || 114,349
|}

References

External links
Senator Elaine Phillips official site

Flower Hill, New York
Living people
Republican Party New York (state) state senators
21st-century American politicians
1959 births